The Limeliters are an American folk music group, formed in July 1959 by Lou Gottlieb (bass violin/bass), Alex Hassilev (banjo/baritone), and Glenn Yarbrough (guitar/tenor). The group was active from 1959 until 1965, and then after a hiatus of sixteen years, Yarbrough, Hassilev, and Gottlieb reunited and began performing again as The Limeliters in reunion tours.  On a regular basis a continuation of The Limeliters group is still active and performing.  Gottlieb died in 1996 (age 72), Yarbrough died in 2016 (age 86), and Hassilev (born 1932), the last founding member, who had remained active in the group,  retired in 2006, leaving the group to carry on without any of the original members.

Origins
Gottlieb performed with the Gateway Singers in the mid-1950s but moved to California to complete his PhD in musicology. Later when he was working as an arranger for the Kingston Trio, Gottlieb was in the audience one night when Alex Hassilev and Glenn Yarbrough appeared on stage to sing a duet together at the Cosmo Alley Coffee Shop in Hollywood. Gottlieb originally suggested that the three of them work together to arrange some material for the Kingston Trio, but they discovered their voices blended well and decided to try to get work on the folk circuit. Journalist John Puccio wrote: "They had the uncanny knack of making three voices sound like six...and thanks to their velvet harmonies making a trio sound like a choir."

They went to Aspen, Colorado, to work at a club called "The Limelite," which Yarbrough and Hassilev had purchased after singing there during the previous ski season. After a short period of perfecting their act, they set off for the "hungry i" in San Francisco, which at the time was the  California nerve center for the mushrooming contemporary folk movement. The owner had just had a group with three long names strung together and was not about to put "Yarbrough, Hassilev, and Gottlieb" up on the marquee.  But the group had not yet decided on a name.  They chose "The Limeliters".

After a strong showing at the Hungry i, they signed with Elektra Records and released their first self-titled album in 1960, and later signed with the Radio Corporation of America (RCA). Their first RCA effort, Tonight in Person, recorded live at the Ash Grove in Hollywood, reached number five on the Billboard album chart.  Writing in the All Music Guide, Cary Ginell noted "this album is a winner all the way and one of the shining examples of the best of the urban folk revival of the early '60s".

The reissue in 1961 of their earlier Elektra album made the top 40 and spent 18 weeks on the charts. Their third release, The Slightly Fabulous Limeliters, made the top ten in the same year, charting for 36 weeks. Another album with staying power was one of folk songs for children of all ages, Through Children's Eyes. It remained charted for 29 weeks and peaked at #25.
Although they did not have a true chart-topping hit record at the time, they were well known for their repertoire of rousing songs including such as "There's a Meetin' Here Tonight," "City of New Orleans," "A Dollar Down" (their only charting single, peaking at #60 in 1961), "Have Some Madeira M'Dear", "Lonesome Traveler," "Wabash Cannonball," "Whiskey in the Jar," and many others which are performed on their more than 25 record albums and in their concerts.

The Limeliters featured in a number of television commercials including their rendition of the jingle, "Things Go Better with Coke" which became a national hit, and other commercial work for L&M cigarettes. The group also toured extensively with a range of performers including stand-up comic Mort Sahl and jazz singer Chris Connor and made appearances on the TV show Hootenanny. Gottlieb recalled that "we were singing for Coca-Cola...the record royalties were good...so it was a very profitable thing." At this time their personal appearances totaled more than 300 performances a year.

In 1963 they sang several songs for the film McLintock!

The group's career nearly came to an end in 1962 when they suffered a plane crash in Provo, Utah while on tour.

The Limeliters break up
Yarbrough left the group in 1963. Gottlieb and Hassilev continued the Limeliters but only as a recording act, recruiting former Gateway Singers tenor Ernie Sheldon as Yarbrough's replacement. Sheldon wrote the lyrics for what became Yarbrough's biggest solo hit, "Baby the Rain Must Fall."

When the trio's RCA Victor contract expired in 1965, Gottlieb and Hassilev formally retired the act. By then Yarbrough was a successful soloist on records and in concert. Hassilev became a producer with his own recording studio and pressing plant, while Gottlieb headed the Morningstar Commune on a ranch he purchased near San Francisco.

The group re-formed briefly in 1968 to record an album for Warner Bros. Records.

The Limeliters return
During the 1970s, the Limeliters embarked on a series of yearly reunion tours with Yarbrough.  Stax Records released a reunion recording in 1974, and in 1976 the group released two concert albums on their own Brass Dolphin Records.  These were so successful that in 1981, Hassilev and Gottlieb decided to reform the group and to get back into the mainstream of entertainment. With the addition of tenor Red Grammer and John David  they again began performing.

After eight productive years, Grammer left the group to pursue a solo career as a children's artist. In 1990, he was replaced by another tenor, Rick Dougherty, whose wide-ranging musical background and bright stage presence brought a fresh dimension to the group.

Gottlieb's death in 1996 saw his high baritone part taken up by a former Kingston Trio member, Bill Zorn.

In 2003, Zorn and Dougherty left the group to join The Kingston Trio (until 2017) and in early 2004, tenor Mack Bailey and comedian baritone Andy Corwin joined the group. In 2006, Hassilev retired and left the band. Soon afterward, Gaylan Taylor joined in 2006. In 2012, Don Marovich joined up with the Limeliters, but in 2019 he joined the Kingston Trio.

Glenn Yarbrough died from complications of dementia in Nashville, Tennessee on August 11, 2016, at the age of 86.

Impact on the music scene
The Limeliters  have been described as a folk group who managed to "successfully integrate smooth harmonies, light political satire and general humor into a national spotlight...[and]...at a time when popular music was beginning to gain an edge, the music of the Limeliters portrayed a simpler, jollier America where educated wisecracks and sing-alongs could suffice as entertainment." Another music critic said that the group were unique because their individual vocal talents were never lost while singing together and  Gottlieb as MC, [peppered] "the act with scholarly witticisms, wry asides and zany non sequiturs." It has been noted that the Limeliters were recognised  more for albums than singles, and became widely known after their shift to RCA Victor which resulted in many of their successful albums.

Reviewing a performance by the group in 1981, Harry Sumrall in The Washington Post, said [that] "a strong gust of musical nostalgia blew into town last night, straight out of the hootenanny days of the early '60s...[and]...there are those cantankerous, persnickety souls who would say that '60s folk was the nadir of American music - and they would be right. But folk is also entertaining and downright fun. And in both senses, the Limeliters were true to the style."

A journalist for the Los Angeles Times wrote that in 1985 the Limeliters were still the biggest names to appear in a series of Sunday night folk concerts called Bound for Glory but there was a time when no "100-seat lounge, like the bar at the Sportsmen's Lodge, could afford to book the trio, one of the most popular groups in the heyday of folk music in the late 1950s and early '60s." In the same article, Gottlieb was quoted as saying [with regard to folk music] "if there is a common denominator in this music, it is that it is primarily acoustic, with almost no electrically amplified instruments, and 80% of it was composed by the performers."

It has been said that the Limeliters were contemporaries of the Kingston Trio in their style and level of popularity, and were one of the top touring college acts in America that "helped mold the folk style and genre for a generation." In 2015 Andy Corwin told the Kokomo Tribune that the vocal harmonies and sense of humour of the group had not changed and live performances were like a party to which the audience was invited. He noted that "we do this because we love it and love passing the music on... a continuation of an act that’s been around for 56 years. The comedy we throw in is intended to keep things lively and moving along."

In 2021, it was noted that for over fifty years, the Limeliters had entertained "standing-room-only crowds with their incredible musical talent and zany sense of humor...[and]... with different configurations over the years, the group has preserved their signature vocal sound", and were still regarded as one of the most "exciting and entertaining vocal acts touring the country."

Discography

Albums

 1960 — The Limeliters [Later re-released as Their First Historic Album]—Elektra
 1961 — Tonight: In Person — RCA Victor (Live)
 1961 — The Slightly Fabulous Limeliters — RCA Victor (Live)
 1962 — Sing Out! — RCA Victor
 1962 — Through Children's Eyes (Little-Folk Songs for Adults) — RCA Victor (Live)
 1962 — Folk Matinee — RCA Victor
 1963 — Makin' a Joyful Noise — RCA Victor
 1963 — Our Men in San Francisco — RCA Victor (Live)
 1963 — Fourteen 14K Folk Songs — RCA Victor (Studio album)
 1964 — More of Everything! — RCA Victor (Studio album)
 1965 — Leave It to the Limeliters — RCA Victor (Studio album)
 1965 — Limeliters Look at Love in Depth — RCA Victor
 1965 — London Concert — RCA Victor (Live, recorded in 1963)
 1968 — Time to Gather Seeds — Warner Bros. (Studio album)
 1974 — Reunion - Glenn Yarbrough and The Limeliters — Stax
 1976 — Reunion, Vol. 1 — Brass Dolphin
 1976 — Reunion, Vol. 2 — Brass Dolphin
 1977 — Pure Gold — RCA
 1982 — Alive in Concert, Vol. 1 — GNP (Live)
 1985 — Alive in Concert, Vol. 2 — GNP (Live)
 1987 — Best of the Limeliters — (RCA Special Products).
 1987 — Harmony! — West Knoll (Live)
 1989 — Potpourri — West Knoll
 1990 — Singing for the Fun — GNP
 1990 — A Mighty Day! — West Knoll
 1991 — Joy Across the Land — West Knoll (Live)
 1992 — Global Carnival — West Knoll
 1999 — Until We Get it Right — Limeliter Productions
 2000 — The Complete RCA Singles Collection — Taragon/RCA/BMG
 2000 — The Chicago Tapes - First Set August 13, 1976 Concert — Folk Era (Live)
 2000 — The Chicago Tapes - Second Set August 14, 1976 Concert — Folk Era (Live)
 2004 — Live In Paradise — Limeliter Productions
 2007 — Right From the Start — (CDBaby)

Compilations and box sets
 1964 — Best of the Limeliters [RCA Victor] — RCA — Mix
 1993 — Best of the Limeliters [Essex] — Essex
 1996 — Two Classic Albums from the Limeliters: The Fabulous Limeliters and Sing Out!
 1997 — 36 All-Time Greatest Hits (3-CD Set)' — RCA/BMG
 2000 — Two Classic Albums from the Limeliters: Our Men in San Francisco and London Concert

Singles
 "The Hammer Song" b/w "Charlie, The Midnight Marauder"; Elektra EKSN-45-8
 "A Dollar Down" b/w "When Twice the Moon Has Come and Gone"; RCA Victor 47-7859 (with picture sleeve)
 "A Hundred Years Ago" b/w "Paco Peco"; RCA Victor 47-7913
 "Red Roses and White Wine" b/w "Milk and Honey" (from the Broadway musical Milk and Honey); RCA Victor 47–7942.
This 45 was also commercially issued as RCA Victor Compact 33 Single 37–7942; it was a 7" vinyl record, but played at 33 rpm.
 "Just an Honest Mistake" (from the production "Let it Ride") b/w "Jonah"; RCA Victor 47-7966
 "I Had a Mule" b/w "The Riddle Song"; RCA Victor 47-8069
 "Who Will Buy?" (from the Broadway musical Oliver) b/w "Funk"; RCA Victor 47-8094 (with picture sleeve)
 "The Midnight Special" b/w "McLintock's Theme (Love In The Country)" from the U.A. Badjac Production "McLintock," RCA Victor 47-8255
 "No Man is an Island" b/w "A Casinha Pequenina (Little House)"; RCA Victor 47-8361
 "Rose" b/w "Seventeen Wives"; RCA Victor 47-8535
 "A Hundred Men" b/w "Cold December (In Your Heart)"; Warner Bros.-Seven Arts Records 7177 (credited to "The Limeliters with Glenn Yarbrough")
 "Time to Gather Seeds" b/w "The Importance of The Rose"; Warner Bros.-Seven Arts Records 7254
 "Consider It Done" b/w "A Pound of Peaches" (Summer's Here); Morningstar MSR-1 (with picture sleeve reading "The Limeliters spring 1973; The Limeliters spring 1963")
 "I See America" b/w "Holy Creation"; STAX Records 0185 (credited to Glenn Yarbrough)
 "American Tour" b/w "Right From the Start"; West Knoll Records WK-1001
 "Beautiful Fantasy" b/w "Heart Full of Love"; West Knoll Records WK-1002

References

External links
Limeliters official site

Musical groups established in 1959
American folk musical groups
American musical trios
RCA Records artists
Elektra Records artists
Warner Records artists
1959 establishments in California
Stax Records artists